Craithes House is a heritage-listed former rural homestead located at 34-40 Borec Road, Penrith in the City of Penrith local government area of New South Wales, Australia. It was built in 1870. The property is privately owned. It was added to the New South Wales State Heritage Register on 2 April 1999.

History 

Description 
The garden is set within a large garden at the end of a peppercorn (Schinus molle) tree avenue, a tall palm adjacent to the house acts as a local landmark.

The house is one of the best examples of a mid-late 19th century rural villa identified within the City of Penrith. A well built rural villa.

Heritage listing 
Craithes House was listed on the New South Wales State Heritage Register on 2 April 1999.

See also 

List of heritage houses in Sydney

References

Bibliography

Attribution 

New South Wales State Heritage Register
Penrith, New South Wales
Homesteads in New South Wales
Houses in Sydney
Houses completed in 1870
1870 establishments in Australia
Articles incorporating text from the New South Wales State Heritage Register